The 2005 Campeonato Ecuatoriano de Fútbol de la Serie A 2005, known as 2005 Copa Pílsener Serie A for sponsorship reasons, was the 48th season of the Serie A, the top level of professional football in Ecuador. The season was divided into two tournaments, called the Apertura and Clausura, with the winner of each earning separate national titles. To date, it marks the only time in Serie A history that two titles were awarded in one year.

Campeonato Apertura
The Apertura tournament was set into two stages. The First Stage was a double round-robin tournament where each team plays the other nine teams twice, once at home and once away. The top eight teams advanced to a two-leg single elimination knockout stage. The last team in the First Stage was relegated to Serie B. The winner of the knockout stage is the Apertura champion, and qualifies as the Ecuador 1 berth in the 2006 Copa Libertadores.

First stage

Playoff stage

(*) Barcelona and D. Cuenca advance because of better First Stage records.

Campeonato Clausura
The Clausura tournament was set into two stages. The First Stage was a double round-robin tournament where each team played the other nine teams twice, once at home and once away. The top six teams in the First Stage advanced to the Liguilla Final, with the top three earning bonus points (3, 2, and 1 point respectively). The last team in the First Stage was relegated to Serie B. The winner of the Liguilla Final was the Clausura champion. The champion and runner-up qualified as the Ecuador 2 and Ecuador 3 berth in the 2006 Copa Libertadores. ESPOLI was promoted to Serie A at the end of Serie B's 2005 Apertura tournament.

First stage

Liguilla Final

See also
2005 in Ecuadorian football

External links
2005 season on RSSSF

2005
Ecu
Football